Togolese Americans are Americans of Togolese descent. According to answers provided to an open-ended question included in the 2000 census, 1,716 people said that their ancestry or ethnic origin was Togolese. An unofficial estimate in 2008 of the Togolese American population was more than 2,500.

History 
The first people from present-day Togo arrived in the United States enslaved. Most of these slaves shipped to the United States were disembarked at the Gulf Coast. The Gulf Coast includes the states of Louisiana, Mississippi, and Alabama. Most of the slaves belonged to the Ewe people which inhabit the south-eastern part of Ghana, Togo, Benin, and south-western Nigeria. This lasted until 1859, when Togolese-descended Cudjo Lewis arrived to Mobile from Dahomey. After the abolition of slavery, few Togolese came to the United States.

Demography 
Most Togolese who live in the United States are in the country legally and have received diversity immigrant visas, which require them to show that they were not likely to become public charges before receiving the visas. Many Togolese emigrated to the U.S. to further their education.

Notable people

Gale Agbossoumonde, soccer player
Tabi Bonney, rapper
Bruce Djite, soccer player
Jonte' Moaning, dancer
Marie Thérèse Metoyer, businesswoman

See also
Togo–United States relations

References 

 
 
West Africans in the United States
Togolese diaspora